The southern lanternfish, Lampanyctus australis, is a lanternfish of the family Myctophidae, found circumglobally in the southern hemisphere between 33° S and 44° S, mainly at below 500 m.  Its length is about 13 cm. It is an oceanic mesopelagic species, eaten by hakes, kingklip and Cape horse mackerel.

References
 

Lampanyctus
Fish described in 1932